Steven Wayne Benson (July 26, 1951 – July 3, 2015) was an American convicted double murderer of his mother, tobacco heiress Margaret Benson; and his brother (actually his nephew but later adopted), tennis player Scott Benson. (Margaret Hitchcock Benson was heiress of the Lancaster Leaf Tobacco Co., Lancaster, Pa., and had no connection with Benson & Hedges brand cigarettes manufactured in the US by Philip Morris.) He was born in 1951 in Baltimore.

On July 9, 1985, Benson placed a pipe bomb in the family car, in which Margaret, Scott, and Steven's sister, Carol Lynn Benson Kendall (a former Miss Florida runner-up), were waiting for Benson to join them when the Chevrolet Suburban exploded. Kendall survived but was badly burned; Margaret and Scott died instantly from the bomb blast. Represented by attorney Michael McDonnell, Steven Benson was ultimately convicted of first degree murder, attempted first degree murder, and arson of a dwelling. He avoided the death penalty, and was sentenced to two life terms in prison. Over the course of his sentence, Benson was transferred to various prisons because of constant threats and abuse from other inmates.

Benson died at Taylor Correctional Institution in Perry, Florida of a stab wound to the right side of the head with a homemade knife on July 3, 2015. Benson was in a long running feud with Cordell Washington, another inmate at the facility. The feud went back to at least 2012 after a series of assaults by Washington. Inmates told investigators that Washington planned to extort $1,000 from Benson within days after arriving at Taylor Correctional Institution. When Benson refused to pay, Washington and another man, identified as Marvin Taylor, ambushed and shanked Benson. Washington was charged with murder for killing Benson, but was acquitted.

In media
Dominick Dunne's investigative crime show Dominick Dunne's Power, Privilege, and Justice devoted an hour for the case of Steven Benson.
Benson is also featured in an episode of the New Detectives entitled "Short Fuse" (Season 2, Episode 3) and an episode of Florida Man Murders entitled "Killer Succession" (Season 1, Episode 3). The case was featured in Great Crimes and Trials and Infamous Murders. In addition, the Benson Family murder case was the subject of The Serpent's Tooth, a 1987 book by Christopher Andersen.

References

1951 births
2015 deaths
American people convicted of arson
American prisoners sentenced to life imprisonment
American people convicted of attempted murder
American people convicted of murder
American people who died in prison custody
Deaths by stabbing in Florida
Matricides
People convicted of murder by Florida
People from Naples, Florida
Prisoners sentenced to life imprisonment by Florida
Prisoners who died in Florida detention
Wealth in the United States